Bobby Bennett may refer to: 

 Bobby Bennett (American Idol), American singer  
 Bobby Bennett (The Famous Flames) (1938–2013), American singer (The Famous Flames)
 Bobby Bennett (footballer) (born 1951), English footballer

See also
Robert Bennett (disambiguation)